Bruce MacCombie (born 1943 in Providence, Rhode Island died May 2, 2012 in Amherst, Massachusetts) was an American composer.

He studied at the University of Massachusetts Amherst and Freiburg Conservatory, and holds a Ph.D. in music from the University of Iowa. He was appointed to the music faculty of Yale University in 1975, and one year later joined the composition faculty of the Yale School of Music.

MacCombie was Director of Publications for G. Schirmer and Associated Music Publishers from 1980 to 1986), Dean of the Juilliard School from 1986 to 1992 and Dean of the School for the Arts at Boston University from 1992 to 2001. Since 2002 he has been Professor of Music at the University of Massachusetts Amherst at Amherst.

His compositions include Nightshade Rounds (1979) for solo guitar (written for Sharon Isbin), Leaden Echo, Golden Echo (1989) for soprano and orchestra, the set of choral pieces Color and Time (1990), Chelsea Tango (1991) for orchestra, and the quintet Greeting (1993) (written for Krzysztof Penderecki's 60th birthday).

MacCombie was named Executive Director of Jazz at Lincoln Center in 2001.  He was succeeded by Derek Gordon in 2004.

References

External links
 Profile at University of Massachusetts Amherst
 Five Colleges New Music Festival profile
 Juilliard School press release
 Boston University's B.U. Bridge News on MacCombie
 Schott Music profile
 Schott Music promoting Color and Time
 Schott Music promoting Elegy

1943 births
2012 deaths
20th-century classical composers
21st-century classical composers
American male classical composers
American classical composers
Hochschule für Musik Freiburg alumni
21st-century American composers
20th-century American composers
20th-century American male musicians
21st-century American male musicians